Ma's Illustrated Catalogue of the Stamps of China (國郵 啚 鑑 or 國郵圖鑑) is a specialized catalogue of earlier Chinese stamps covering the periods from the Qing Dynasty to the Republic of China. It provides the most comprehensive and systematic record of every stamp from the first Customs issue of 1878 to the Dah Tung print Postage Due stamp in 1947. Ma's Illustrated Catalogue differs from other stamp catalogues as it goes beyond a simple listing of stamps. Ma's catalogue provides a wealth of philately related information of high historical significance that is much needed in the research and study of early Chinese stamps. Today many refer to this catalogue as simply "馬氏圖鑑" or "馬氏國郵圖鑑".

The first edition was primarily sourced from hand written manuscripts edited by the late Ma Zung-Sung (馬潤叟  1872-1945). His son, Ma Ren-Chuen (馬任全 1908-1988), already a postal expert in Chinese stamps and like his father a philatelist, was inspired by his father's unfinished wish to put together a comprehensive catalogue during the last four years of his life. After his father's death in 1945,  and after extensive consultation with a number of Shanghai's authoritative philatelic experts and philatelic literature collectors, he compiled and supplemented his father's original manuscripts and then translated the entire work from traditional Chinese to English. The first edition was published with 661 black & white illustrations. The costs for typesetting, proofreading, printing, publishing, and distributing were self-funded by Ma alone.  A small quantity of 1000 copies was printed by Shun Chang & Co. (順昌), in Shanghai, China in June 1947 (民國三十六年). For many years the catalogue was the most inclusive stamp catalogue ever published in China, and it was
the first and the only one printed in both Chinese and English texts together in one volume and exclusively published by a Chinese person. Stamp catalogues prior to Ma's were all available only in English and were printed overseas by foreign stamp dealers, often including incomplete or contradicting information among the various catalogues. The catalogue had made it possible for universal sharing and education of early Chinese stamps by all collectors in China or overseas.

First edition 

When first published the catalogue was regarded as a considerable expense. There was no set retail price as this was unnecessary for a self-published and privately sold book. The book was sold at the office of the printing house. A full page advertisement on the back cover of the November 1947 issue of The New Light Philatelic Magazine, Vol 14, No. 2 (《新光郵票雜誌》民國三十六年十一月十四卷第二期) listed the retail price of the catalogue as 500,000 yuan in National Currency. To put this price into perspective, the highest bank note denomination in 1947 was a 10,000 yuan note, the magazine where the advertisement appeared was sold for 10,000 yuan a copy, and the price for placing the full page advertisement was 2,400,000 yuan. In other words, if the magazine was sold for $10 a copy, a fair market price in 2016, then the catalogue would have been sold at an equivalent of $500, which was considered by many to be a substantial amount of money.

How to confirm a first edition 
The first edition has a scarlet colour hardcover with gilt lettering in both Traditional Chinese ( written vertically) and English (written horizontally) on the front cover. A small horse emblem ("馬圖", pronounced "Ma" in Chinese, the editor's last name, mainly used for anti-counterfeiting) is embossed at the centre of the back cover. The front and back covers are further embossed with wrinkle like patterns such as those found on the palm of a hand, except within the area of the horse emblem. The number 1947 is located right below the book title frame. Every authentic copy has a distinct serial number (out of 1000) stamped in black ink on the endpaper opposite the back cover. The pages are bound together, using the "Sewing Through the Fold" method, with four binding threads visible. It has 568 pages.  The book measures 14mm x 19.5mm. The paper used is an advanced and costly paper called Art Paper (銅版紙), often referred as Coated Printing Paper (塗佈印刷紙), or Coated Paper (粉紙). The paper is coated with a thin clay to give it a more prestigious feel and elegant look. The prints can be felt when running one's fingers over the page.  The pages are uncut, and lie flat when the book is opened. There is no dust jacket issued with this book.

The cost for the paper and for the printing material are primary factors for the extremely high retail price.

Unauthorized reprints 
The first edition proved to be extremely popular and was quickly regarded by many to be the bible of China philately. On account of the very low initial production, a retail price not affordable by most collectors, and the lack of official second printings or updated editions for the next 40+ years, many unauthorized copies were produced in Hong Kong, Taiwan, and Japan and sold worldwide well into the 1980s. While the author was well aware of the outright stealing of his work, he was neither compensated, nor have the ability to enforce a stop to the copying due to China's political environment at the time and its isolation from the rest of the world, which both had immense affect and influence on publication and copyright laws. In a written correspondence with Mr. Ma You Zhang (see third edition) dated January 9. And because the reprints were purposely made to look like the original work, the reprint books themselves do not say that they are reprints. In fact, the publication date of June 1947 on the title page and July 1947 on the copyright page both remain unchanged in those books printed at a much later date. The original first edition and the unauthorized reprints may be distinguished by the following descriptions and distinct features.

Ma's numbering system 
To catalogue early Chinese stamps is complicated. The first postage stamps in China were, in fact, issued by the western nations occupying special concessions, known as 'Treaty Ports', which had been snatched from Imperial China by the Treaty of Nanking in 1842. The first Treaty Ports stamp was issued in 1865 by the Shanghai Municipal Post, with additional Local Posts followed in sixteen other Treaty Ports. The postal services were taken over by the Qing government in November 1897 after it established the Imperial Chinese Post. After the overthrow of the Qing Dynasty in 1911, central authority was broken apart. During the period of the Republic of China (1912 - 1949), ongoing conflict between the Beiyang government, the Nationalist's Guomindang government, the Communist party (about 1930 - 1949), the remnant Northern warlords government, and the Empire of Japan all further fragmented China's postal system. Without a unified central government, the semi-autonomous regional governments issued their own stamps at various times to meet postal needs; Japan had issued "Occupation" stamps through their puppet governments, and the Chinese Communist Party had issued "Liberated area" stamps. The designation "Liberated Areas" refers to areas the Communists "liberated" from the Nationalists and / or the Japanese. The Liberated Areas alone already issued an estimated more than 500 sets of stamps with over 2,300 values. As these stamps are printed under war conditions, done mostly underground, and most of the stamps are coarsely printed using the simplest printing techniques on sub-standard equipment, and made use of any raw material available at the time.  In fact, the first stamps issued by the new Nationalist government simply utilized remaining stocks of Imperial stamps, overprinting them with the words, 'Republic of China' until they could print new stamps. Outside of the Liberated Areas, co-existing provisional governments also find themselves difficult to unify their monetary system with the central authority of the time. Disparities and devaluation of local currencies from the ever-changing National Currency (oftentimes value had to be recalculated in a matter of hours) only promoted speculation on stamps. Such complicating factors demanded an unusual varieties of overprints (to restrict their use in a designated region so to stop speculators from profiting) or surcharging (charging extra money in National currency to make up for the difference in value). Moreover, as the central printing is done in Beijing or by externally contracted printers, the stamps are often delayed and rendering the value printed on the stamps useless. At times of an urgent need for postage stamps quickly, stocks of old issue stamps are simply overprinted by the local Post Masters, which often resulted in minor differences in design and colour variations occurring between official printers. After such a long period of complicated factors, coupled with other secret markings and numerous printing errors in between had all made it very difficult to distinguish and to document every early Chinese stamp, comprehensively or by chronological order alone.

In all, there are five main issuers of early Chinese stamps - Treaty Ports, Qing Dynasty, Republic of China, Japanese occupation, and Liberated areas. Ma's Illustrated Catalogue focused on stamps officially issued by the Qing Dynasty and the Republic of China, along with relevant provincial issues, Air Mail stamps, and Postage Due stamps issued during the same period.

Ma's first edition catalogue listed stamps under a numbering system now universally recognized as the Ma's catalogue number (馬氏編號). Numbers without a preceding letter are regular issues of the Qing Dynasty and the Republic of China. An Alphabet Letter preceding a stamp number denotes special purpose stamps or territorial stamps such as Provincial Overprints, Air Mail stamps, and Postage Due stamps. Letters following the stamp number are stamp errors and other special varieties.

Other noted features of the first edition 

The first edition neither provides a table of contents nor an index.

The catalogue does not provide coverage for Military stamps, postcards, aerogramme, and stamps issued by treaty ports, colonial outposts, revolutionary base, and liberated areas.

Although the catalogue is printed in both Chinese and English text together, the material presented are not formal equivalent in nature and should not be regarded as a word-for-word translation.

Diagrams of overprints and special markings are not photo extrapolation from actual stamps, rather they are hand-drawn diagrams where the actual location or the size of some letters may not correspond exactly to an actual stamp.

Regular Issues of the Qing Dynasty and the Republic of China are listed in chronological order. A total of 1115 varieties are recorded.

Provincial Overprint Issues, Air Mail stamps, and Postage Due stamps are grouped by province, then by stamp issue, then by special printing varieties such as printer name and special watermark. This section recorded over 1992 varieties.

Detailed issuing history, features, and variations including the date of issue, denomination, origin of the paper, quality of paper, quality of gum, printer's name, watermark, colour, ink, perforation, number of panes per sheet, number of stamps per sheet and how they are positioned, and how many lots had been issued, are noted within.

In the first edition the stamp prices quoted are in "Stamp Units", a reference value not tied to a particular currency. It is useful only for indicating the relative degree of rarity/value from one stamp to another, and should not be interpreted as an actual dollar amount. Since this book does not get updated on a frequent basis like other annually published stamp catalogues, there is an advantage to the "Stamp Units" style of pricing. Unfortunately it is not useful for anyone trying to price their collection with the most current street value. In subsequent editions the currency of the publisher country is used as a base for representing local value in order to be more useful to local collectors.

Prices for plate blocks are provided in the first edition. These prices are removed in subsequent editions.

The Chinese text portion refers to dates prior to 1912 by the Chinese Era Name (the last emperor officially abdicated on February 12, 1912), after 1912 by the Minguo Calendar, while the English text uses the Gregorian Calendar.

Second edition 

The 1988 revised and supplemented second edition was also edited by Ma Ren-Chuen. It was the first revision and update of the original catalogue since its publication 40 years earlier, and which Ma had decided to publish separate Chinese and English editions of the catalogue. The Chinese version of the catalogue was finished by 1983 and was sent to 中國集郵出版社 for publication. However, by 1985 the new edition was still not published. After much inquiries by his family and colleagues, they found the reason for the delay was partly due to the inclusion of some politically sensitive commemorative stamps issued near the final years of the Republic of China which at the time were deemed to be the "enemies of the people" and deemed inappropriate for publication by the 中國集郵出版社. Unfortunately the inclusion of such stamps was unavoidable for attaining comprehensive information on stamps issued in that period. Finally another printing house, Shanghai Cultural Press, 上海文化出版社, in early 1986 agreed to take on the printing of the Chinese text version. After this happy news Ma immediately began translating the entire work to English for the English publication.

Ma was then in the last years of his life and had been diagnosed with lung cancer in early 1987. Knowing that the translation work might never be completed if he were to stop, he asked to postpone all surgeries necessary for removing his cancer tumour and only to remain on mild medication for his cancer treatment in order to continue his work on finishing the catalogue while at the hospital. His son Ma Youzhang in an article published in the January 1989 edition of China Philately paying tribute to his late father accounted for how his father while updating the English manuscripts of the catalogue would secretly return home from the hospital when his work required it. Ma's determination to finish the catalogue while he was still alive never left him. The English revision was finally completed by the end of 1987 and was sent to Lee H. Hill Jr. for publication in the USA under Hill-Donnelly Corporation, and appointing Lee as his representative with full powers to find a publisher to publish the new catalogue. Lee H. Hill Jr., who now operated a publishing house, is an old acquaintance of Ma, whom he met while on a business trip to the United States back in 1947. While Lee H. Hill took only four months to edit and typeset the manuscripts and promised the book would be published by the end of July, and he would send the first copy to Ma by express mail. Ma Ren Chuen died on July 15, 1988, and he never saw the second editions, in English or Chinese, in book-form.

The catalogue had been expanded to cover all the Republic of China issues through the Silver Yuan issues of 1949, Military Post, Stamp Booklets, and stamps issued while under Japanese Occupation and the British Railway Administration. Also added were new date and quantity of issue information, additional pictures showing the stamp varieties within the same issue, and hand-drawn illustrations showing intricate details for identifying them.

English text 

The English text version is soft-bound, with gold lettering on a blue cover. The location of the date 1947 first printed on the first edition has been updated to read 1988. The Ma's reference numbering system follows that of the original 1947 edition. Newly added is a Table of Contents and a cross-reference table of "Modern" vs. "Traditional" spellings (for example, "Beijing" vs. "Peking"). The number of black & white pictures and illustrations was expanded from 661 in the first edition to 1132. The total number of pages is 788. Market prices have been updated to US dollars but are still expressed in "Stamp Units" indicating the relative scarcity and value of each stamp. The retail price was $46.50 (US) that included delivery to the US or Canada, and $49.50 (US) for delivery to Europe.

Chinese text 

The Chinese version is renamed Zhongguo you piao tu jian 1878-1949 "中国邮票图鉴(1878 －1949)" written in Simplified Chinese. In fact the entire catalogue has been rewritten in Simplified Chinese. The first printing is dated December 1988 and is printed in China by Shanghai Culture Publishing House  上海文化出版社. The book is hard-bound, with gold letters on a green colour cover.  It comes with a gold/white colour book jacket and black & gold lettering.

Stamp categories covered in this edition include: Qing Dynasty, Republic of China, Air Mail, Postage Due, Military, and stamp booklets.

A table of contents was added, as well as updates of stamp release dates, quantity printed, pictures, places where stamps were first sold, secret markings, etc.

Market prices have been updated to 1987 values and are expressed in Renminbi for the ease of reference by Chinese Nationals.

Due to Ma's poor health and his desire to personally witness his book's publication, numerous typesetting related errors were only discovered after the catalogue was printed and sold. In total 169 errors were documented by his eldest son, 馬延璋, who published an error reference guide (勘誤表) in October 1989 and originally provided only to members of The New Light Philatelic (新光郵票會會員) as a supplement to the catalogue. This guide is reprinted in the September 2006 Philatelic Publication 集郵文獻擷英 2006年9月出版的彩二期(總第5期). One such error is noted on the book cover and cover jacket where the year of stamp coverage 1897-1949 is misprinted and thus is incorrect. The date "1897-1949" only appears on the first edition covers and subsequent editions have this error corrected to read 1878–1949.

The first printing of 4,000 copies retails for 16.50 Renminbi. The second printing of 10,000 copies is dated April 1989 and retails for 21.50 Renminbi. The third printing of 3,000 copies is dated May 1992 and retails for 21.50 Renminbi. The total number of pages is 490.

1995 Lee H. Hill Jr. edition 

The 1995 edition is edited by Lee H. Hill Jr. and published by Hill-Donnelly Corporation in Tampa, FL, USA. This edition is printed in English text only and covers the earliest, the most valuable, and often most difficult to decipher stamp issues from 1878–1911 with enhanced illustrations, detailed descriptions, and specific identification techniques unique to each stamp issue.  A total of 138 digitally scanned images of actual stamps are printed in black & white throughout the 202 pages on 8.5 X 11 papers. The book is soft-bound, with gold letters on a blue cover. The additional title "Volume 1 - Empire 1878-1911" is added, as well as an update to the publication date of 1995 on the front cover.

1998 Lee H. Hill Jr. edition 

The 1998 edition is edited by Lee H. Hill Jr. and published by Hill-Donnelly Corporation in Tampa, FL, USA. This version is supplemented from the 1988 edition with additional enhancements and updated to 1998 prices in US dollars. The book is soft-bound, 558 pages, 8.5 X 11 papers, with gold letters on a blue cover.

Third edition 

After five years of work in 2009 the third edition was revised and published by Ma You Zhang (馬佑璋, b. Nov. 1939), the son of the late editor Ma Ren-Chuen and the grandson of the original editor Ma Zung-Sung, and the younger brother of 馬延璋 who published the error reference guide for the second edition. The title of the third edition has been updated to 中國郵票圖鑑 1878 －1949 (Zhong guo you piao tu jian) written in Simplified Chinese. The first printing of this edition was December 2009 by 冮苏人民出版社.

Besides the preface and a table of contents presented in English, all other sections of this book are written in Chinese.

This edition now covers all Chinese stamp issues from the very first Qin Dynasty issue of the "Customs Post Large Dragon" to the final Republic of China "Silver Yuan" issue in 1949 (up until the founding of the People's Republic of China), as well as Provincial Issues, Special Purpose Issues (Airmail, Postage Due, Military Post, Stamp Booklets), and Occupied Area Issues (British Railway Administration, Japanese Occupation, Shandong and Hbei Overprints, Northern China, Central China, Southern China, and Manchukuo issues).

Updates are included for any new variation types discovered since the previous edition, including revisions to some historical information of each stamp issue, ways to decipher the different varieties, corrections of some misprints, and revised market prices, which have been updated to 2009 values and are expressed in Renminbi for the ease of reference by Chinese Nationals. Prices for blocks have been removed.

The original Ma's numbering reference system is unchanged and follows that of the 1988 Chinese edition. Both Custom Post and Republic of China issues are identified by a reference number only. Starting with the Provincial Issues, stamp numbers are preceded by one or two Chinese characters to denote the primary variety, followed by a numeric number. For example, "華北 1003" is designated for stamp variety 1003 in the Northern China Issues.

Both the names of Ma Ren-Chuen (editor) and Ma Zubg-Sung (Supplemented) appear on the cover. The total number of pages is 470. The total number of illustrations is 1135. Paper used is coated paper.

Pictures of stamps and related illustrations remain printed in black and white only.

There is a marked difference in the way some descriptions are written between the first edition and third edition. For example, colours written in the order of the variant colour followed by the base primary colour in the first edition are now written in reversed order: 藍綠與黑 and 紅與黑 (1947) vs. 黑與藍綠 and 黑與紅 (2009).

There are two versions, a collector edition and a regular hardcover edition.

Collector presentation edition 

This edition is hard-bound. The cover has gold letters on a red cover. Only 100 copies were printed and it is not for sale. This edition is reserved as commemorative gifts from Ma Zubg-Sung, with his autograph and chop stamped on the inside cover. Similar to the first edition, for the purpose of anti-counterfeiting, a small horse emblem ("馬圖", pronounced "Ma" in Chinese, the editor's last name) is engraved at the centre of the back cover. Each book is printed with a serial number from 1 to 100.

Hardcover edition 

This edition is also hard-bound, but the cover has gold letters written on a green background. Officially there is a horse-emblem engraved on the back cover, however, a sample of an error variety has been found without such a horse emblem.  It has the same ISBN as the red cover version, but instead of "Collector Edition (珍藏版)" noted below the ISBN, a retail price of 98.00 Renminbi Yuan (精裝) is printed instead.

First edition table of contents 

Below is a listing of the stamp varieties covered:

Qing Dynasty 

 First Customs Issue, p. 1-9
 Second Customs Issue, p. 10-13
 Commemorative Issue of Empress Dowager, p. 14-21
 Surcharges of Dollar Values, p. 22
 Small Figure Surcharge on Second Customs Issue, p. 23-24
 Small Figure Surcharge on Dowager Jubilee Issue, p. 25-29
 Large Figure Surcharge on Dowager Jubilee Issue, p. 30-35
 Large Figure Surcharge on Second Customs Issue (Pakhoi Set), p. 36-37
 Large Figure Surcharge 1.5mm below Chinese Characters on Dowager Jubilee Issue, p. 37-41
 Difference between the first and re-engraved prints of Dowager Jubilee Issue, p42 - 43
 3 cents Red Revenue stamps surcharged for postal use, p. 44-56
 Japan Lithographed "Imperial Chinese Post" the first imperial issue, p. 57-59
 "Chinese Imperial Post" the second imperial issue 1898 watermarked, p. 60-64
 "Chinese imperial post" the third imperial issue 1902-1910 unwatermarked, p. 65-74
 Peking-Shanhaikwan Railway pro tem stamps, p. 75-77
 Hsuan Tung Enthronement commemorative issue, p. 78

Republic of China 
 Foochow Neutrality Issue, p. 79-80
 Hankow, Nanking & Changsha neutrality issue, p. 81-83
 Republic of China overprinted on the third imperial issue, p. 84-90
 The commemorative issues of the revolution and the republic, p. 91-93
 The regular republic issues, p. 94-97
 Second republic issue first Peking print, p. 97-99
 Differences between the London and the First Peking prints of the Junk Reaper and Hall of classic issues, p. 99-102
 The Hung Shian commemorative stamps (Specimens), p. 103
 ReEngraved Republican Issue Second Peking Print, p. 104-106
 Differences between the first and the second prints of the junk reaper and hall of classic issues, p. 107-114
 Famine Relief Issue Surcharged on Junk Type Stamps, p. 115
 The Commemorative stamps of the 25th Anniversary of the establishment if the Chinese Post Office, p. 116
 The Commemorative Issue of the constitution, p. 117-118
 Marshal Chang Tso Lin Commemorative Issue, p. 118-119
 Unification Commemorative Issue, p. 120
 Dr. Sun Yat-Sen State Burial commemorative issue, p. 121
 The Northwest scientific expedition commemorative issue, p. 122-123
 The Dr. Sun Yat-Sen issue London print, p. 124-138
 The Martyrs Issue Peking print, p. 139-142
 Tan Yen-Kai Commemorative Issue, p. 143
 The new Life Movement commemorative issue, p. 144-146
 The 150th anniversary of the USA constitution commemorative issue, p. 147-148
 Stamps of Hong Kong Prints, p. 149-163
 Dah Tung Prints, p. 164-177
 Hong Kong Martyrs issue, p. 178-190
 New York Print, p. 191-202
 Thrift Commemorative Issue, p. 203
 30th Anniversary of the Republic of China Commemorative Stamps, p. 204-205
 7 cents on 8 cents, p. 206-207
 1 cent on 1/2 cent, p. 208-217
 Special Stamps for express and registered mails, p. 218-219
 New Peking print, Dr. Sun Yat-Sen and Martyrs issues, p. 220-229
 Central Trust Print, Dr. Sun Yat-Sen issue, p. 230-235
 Pacheng Print, Dr. Sun Yat-Sen issue, p. 236-242
 Secret marks of Pacheng Print central trust type issue, p. 243
 16 cents central trust issue surcharged with "surcharged for domestic postage paid", p. 244-249
 16 cents re-surcharged 50 cents, p. 250-259
 50 cents surcharged on 16 cents central trust issue, p. 260-265
 20 cents surcharges, p. 266-285
 Chungking Chung Hwa print, p. 286-287
 Refugee Relief commemorative issue, p. 287-289
 Postal Savings Picture Stamps, p. 290
 50th Anniversary of Kuomintang, p. 291-292
 20th anniversary of Dr. Sun Yat-Sen's death commemorative issue, p. 293-294
 Equal Treaties commemorative issue, p. 295-296
 President Lin Sen Commemorative Issue, p. 296-297
 President Chiang Kai Shek inauguration commemorative issue, p. 298-299
 Victory Commemorative issue, p. 300-302
 New Chungking central trust print Dr. Sun Yat-Sen issue, p. 303-304
 Third London Print Dr. Sun Yat-Sen, p. 304-305
 National currency surcharge, p. 306-308
 National currency surcharge Kaifeng overprint, p. 309-311
 National currency surcharge Shanghai Union Overprint, p. 312-317
 National currency Chungking central trust surcharge, p. 317-323
 Chungking Dah Tung Print Dr. Sun Yat-Sen, p. 324-325
 Shanghai Dah Tung Print Dr. Sun Yat-Sen Issue, p. 326-327
 President Chiang Kai Shek 60th Birthday commemorative Issue, p. 328-331
 National Assembly Commemorative issue, p. 332-335
 Victory Return of Government Commemorative issue, p. 336
 Fourth London Print Dr. Sun Yat-Sen issue (Torch Type), p. 337

Provincial Issues 

 Provincial Overprints, Tibet overprint on third imperial issue, p. 344-345
 Singkiang Overprints, p. 346-376
 Yunnan overprints, p. 377-385
 Ki-Hei overprints, p. 386-390
 Szechuen overprints, p. 391-393
 North China provincial overprints, p. 394-395
 Six-District overprints, small characters, p. 396-413
 Six-District overprints, large characters, p. 414-432
 North China half value overprints, p. 433-442
 Hwa Pei issue commemorating Tenth anniversary of Manchukuo, p. 443-445
 Mengkiang Half Value overprints, p. 446-450
 Hwa Pei commemorative issue of rendition of concessions, p. 451
 Hwa Pei stamps commemorative fifth anniversary of puppet north china postal service, p. 452
 Mengkiang postal & Telegraphic services commemorative issue, p. 453
 Hwa Pei original value overprints, p. 454-461
 Mengkiang fifth anniversary of puppet admission commemorative issue, p. 462
 Mengkiang Stamps commemorating second anniversary of the pacific war, p. 463
 Hwa Pei first anniversary of war commemorative issue, p. 464
 Hwa Pei fourth anniversary of establishment of puppet political council commemorative issue, p. 465
 Hwa Pei puppet issue with new values commemorating return of puppet government to Nanking, p. 466
 Hwa Pei sixth anniversary of puppet North China general post office commemorative issue, p. 467
 Hwa Pei stamps commemorating the death of puppet Wang Ching Wei, p. 468-469
 Mengkiang increasing production commemorative stamp, p. 470
 Hwa Pei stamps commemorating second anniversary of participating in war, p. 471-472
 Rendition of settlement and concession commemorative issue surcharged with Hwa Pei and new values, p. 473
 Hwa Pei stamps commemorating fifth anniversary of the establishment of the puppet North China Political Council, p. 474-475
 Mengkiang original value stamps, p. 476-478
 New Peking Sing Ming Print Dr. Sun Yat-Sen issue, p. 478-479
 Mengkiang surcharged stamps, p. 480-483
 Seventh anniversary of puppet North China General post office commemorative stamps, p. 484-485
 Shanghai puppet value surcharges, p. 486-496
 Rendition of Shanghai foreign settlements commemorative stamps, p. 497-498
 First anniversary of rendition of Shanghai foreign settlement and concession commemorative stamps, p. 498-499
 Puppet issue commemorating the fourth anniversary return of government to Nanjing, p. 500
 Surcharged 4th anniversary of return of government to Nanjing puppet commemorative issue, p. 501
 Anti-Raid Stamps, p. 502
 Kwangtung overprints, p. 503-510
 Taiwan (Formosa) overprints, p. 511-514
 President Chiang Kai Shek 60th birthday commemorative stamps, p. 515
 Taiwan overprint National Assembly commemorative issue, p. 516
 Taiwan issue victory return of government commemorative stamps, p. 517
 Northeast Provincial Issues, p. 518-526

Air Mail Stamps 

 Air Mail Stamps, p. 527-528
 Singkiang air mail stamps overprinted on junk & Reaper Type issue, p. 529-530
 Peking Mukden air mail stamps, p. 531
 Third Air Mail issue Peking print, p. 532-533
 The Fourth air mail stamps HongKong prints, p. 534-536
 Surcharged air mail stamps with Japanese currency, p. 537-538
 SingKiang overprinted Peking & HongKong print air mail stamps, p. 539-541
 National Currency air mail stamps, p. 542-543
 Dah Tung Print Air Mail Stamp, p. 544

Postage Due Stamps 

 Postage Due Stamps, p. 545-568

Provenance 
This section is to track the ownership history of confirmed first editions. Every piece of evidence (knowledge of particular owners) is treated as a valuable clue for provenance, therefore it can be geographically located and chronologically dated. Explicit ownership notes are further categorized and stored, where known.

See also 
 Postage stamps and postal history of China

References

Stamp catalogs
Philately of China